Rectarcturidae is a family of marine isopods belonging to the suborder Valvifera.

Genera
There are four genera:
 Galathearcturus Poore, 2013
 Nowrarcturus Poore, 2013
 Rectarcturus Schultz, 1981
 Tasmarcturus Poore, 2013

References

Valvifera
Crustacean families